Aprominta aperitta is a moth of the family Autostichidae. It is found on the Aegean Islands.

References

Moths described in 1997
Aprominta
Moths of Europe